The Generika Ayala Lifesavers are a professional women's volleyball team owned by Actimed, Inc. (Generika Drugstore) in partnership with Ayala Corporation.

History
Generika Drugstore first became involved in the Philippine Superliga (PSL) when it sponsored the Philippine Army Lady Troopers during the 2014 All-Filipino Conference, playing as the "Generika-Army Lady Troopers". For the following conference, the company formed its own team composed of the coaching staff and most of the players from the disbanded AirAsia Flying Spikers. The franchise did not participate during the 2015 season and remnants of the team went on to form the nucleus of the Shopinas.com Lady Clickers.

The company reactivated its PSL participation during the 2016 All-Filipino Conference with a new lineup.

Since 2017, the team was renamed "Generika Ayala Lifesavers" with the entry of Ayala Corporation as the team's co-sponsor. Ayala Corporation, through its subsidiary Ayala Healthcare Holdings, Inc., acquired 50% of Actimed Inc. (Generika Drugstore) in July 2015.As of 2019, Ayala now owns 52% of the company.

Due to the COVID-19 pandemic, the 2020 season of the PSL was cancelled. Prior to the beginning of 2021 season, the team, along with two other member teams took an indefinite leave of absence from the league.

Name changes
Generika-Army Lady Troopers (2014 PSL All-Filipino Conference)  
Generika LifeSavers (2014-2016)  
Generika Ayala Lifesavers (2017-present)

Current roster
For the 2020 PSL Grand Prix Conference:

Position main

The following is the Generika Ayala Lifesavers roster in the: 2020 PSL Grand Prix Conference

Head coach
  Sherwin Meneses
Assistant Coach(es)
  Parly Tupaz
  Ronald Dulay
  Bryan Vitug
Team manager
  Allyn Sta. Maria
| valign="top" |

Doctor
  Bryan Vitug
Physical Therapist
  Dimaculangan/Vitug

 Team Captain
 Import
 Draft Pick
 Rookie
 Inactive
 Suspended
 Free Agent
 Withdrew
 Injured

Previous roster

For the 2018 PSL All-Filipino Conference:

Head coach
  Sherwin Meneses
Assistant Coach(es)
  Parly Tupaz
  Ronald Dulay
  Bryan Vitug
Team manager
  Allyn Sta. Maria
| valign="top" |

Doctor
  Bryan Vitug
Physical Therapist
  Dimaculangan/Vitug

 Team Captain
 Import
 Draft Pick
 Rookie
 Inactive
 Suspended
 Free Agent
 Injured

For the 2018 PSL Invitational Cup:

Head coach
  Sherwin Meneses
Assistant Coach(es)
  Parly Tupaz
  Ronald Dulay
  Bryan Vitug
Team manager
  Allyn Sta. Maria
| valign="top" |

Doctor
  Bryan Vitug
Physical Therapist
  Dimaculangan/Vitug

 Team Captain
 Import
 Draft Pick
 Rookie
 Inactive
 Suspended
 Free Agent
 Injured

For the 2018 PSL Grand Prix Conference:

Head coach
  Sherwin Meneses
Assistant Coach(es)
  Parly Tupaz
  Ray Karl Dimaculangan
  Bryan Vitug
Team manager
  Allyn Sta. Maria
| valign="top" |

Conditioning coach
  Kath Tenorio
Physical Therapist
  Alexandra Mercurio

 Team Captain
 Import
 Draft Pick
 Rookie
 Inactive
 Suspended
 Free Agent
 Injured

For the 2017 PSL Grand Prix Conference:

Head coach
  Francis Vicente
Assistant Coach(es)
  Zenaida Chavez
  Ronald Dulay
Team manager
  Allyn Sta. Maria
| valign="top" |

Doctor
  Emmanuel Calipes
Physical Therapist
  Rey Dimaculangan

 Team Captain
 Import
 Draft Pick
 Rookie
 Inactive
 Suspended
 Free Agent
 Injured

For the 2017 PSL All-Filipino Conference:

Head coach
  Francis Vicente
Assistant Coach(es)
  Zenaida Chavez
  Rosemarie Prochina
  Emmanuel Calipes
Team manager
  Allyn Sta. Maria
| valign="top" |

Physical Therapist
  Rey Dimaculangan

 Team Captain
 Import
 Draft Pick
 Rookie
 Inactive
 Suspended
 Free Agent
 Injured

For the 2017 PSL Invitational Cup:

Head coach
  Francis Vicente
Assistant Coach(es)
  Zenaida Chavez
  Rosemarie Prochina
Team manager
  Allyn Sta. Maria
| valign="top" |

Physical Therapist
  Rey Dimaculangan

 Team Captain
 Import
 Draft Pick
 Rookie
 Inactive
 Suspended
 Free Agent
 Injured

For the 2016 PSL Grand Prix Conference:

Head coach
  Francis Vicente
Assistant Coach(es)
  Zenaida Chavez
  Rosemarie Prochina
  Jeffrey Drio
Team manager
  Allyn Sta. Maria
| valign="top" |

Physical Therapist
  Hope Parrocho

 Team Captain
 Import
 Draft Pick
 Rookie
 Inactive
 Suspended
 Free Agent
 Injured

For the 2014 PSL Grand Prix Conference:

For the 2014 PSL All-Filipino Conference:

Coaching staff
 Head coach: Sgt. Rico de Guzman
 Assistant coach(es): Sgt. Emilio Reyes  Pfc. Randy Fallorina

Team staff
 Team Manager: Brig. Gen. Victor Bayani
 Team Utility: Pfc. Melvin Carolino

Medical staff
 Team Physician: 
 Physical Therapist:  Louis Frederick Bahin, PTRP   Rey Jimenez Cruz, PTRP   Hubert Esteban, PTRP

Honors

Club

Individual

Team captains
  Cristina Salak (2014)
  Charleen Abigail Cruz (2014)
  Rubie de Leon (2016)
  Jeushl Wensh Tiu (2016)
  Geneveve Casugod (2017, 2017)
  Angeli Pauline Araneta (2017 – 2019)
  Rhea Dimaculangan (2020)

Imports

Coaches
 Sgt. Enrico de Guzman (2014 All-Filipino)
 Ramil de Jesus (2014 Grand Prix)
 Francis Vicente (2016–2017)
 Sherwin Meneses (2018–2020)

Transactions

Grand Prix

Additions
 Marivic Velaine Meneses (from Petron)
 April Ross Hingpit (from Petron)

Subtractions
 Chlodia Eiriel Ysabella Cortez (to Petron)
 Mary Grace Masangkay (to Cignal)
 Shiela Marie Pineda (to United VC)

References

External links
 PSL-Generika Lifesavers Page

Philippine Super Liga
2014 establishments in the Philippines
Volleyball clubs established in 2014
Women's volleyball teams in the Philippines